HMS Totem was a Group 3 T-class submarine of the Royal Navy which entered service in the last few months of World War II. To-date, she is the only ship of the Royal Navy to have been named Totem.

Totem was sold to Israel in 1965 and commissioned into the Israeli Sea Corps in 1967 as INS Dakar. She sank whilst on passage from the United Kingdom to Israel in January 1968.

As HMS Totem

The submarine was presented with a totem pole by the Cowichan Tribes in 1945, which was stolen during the 1950s when the boat was visiting Halifax, Canada. The pole was fitted to the front of the bridge fin when the submarine was in harbour.

At the end of the war, all surviving T-class Group 1 and Group 2 boats were scrapped, but the Group 3 boats (which were of welded rather than riveted construction) were retained and fitted with snorkel masts.

In January 1948 it was formally acknowledged that the main operational function of the British submarine fleet would now be to intercept Soviet submarines slipping out of their bases in Northern Russia to attack British and Allied merchant vessels. The following April, the Assistant Chief of Naval Staff, Rear-Admiral Geoffrey Oliver circulated a paper in which he proposed that British submarines take a more offensive role by attacking Soviet submarines off the Northern Russian coast and mining the waters in the area. With the surface fleet dramatically reduced following the end of the Second World War, he commented that this was one of the few methods the Royal Navy had for "getting to the enemy on his home ground".

To fulfil this new role, Totem was one of eight boats which were extensively modified to become "super T-conversions", giving them higher speed and quieter operation underwater. Five further T-class submarines were given much less extensive streamlining improvements.

The hull was streamlined, which included the removal of the deck gun and the replacement of the bridge fin with one which was taller, enclosing the periscopes and masts. The radar and sonar were updated at the same time. After the submarine had returned to service, her top speed exceeded , aided by the unofficial removal in the dockyard at Malta of the housing for the airguard radar aerial which added 3/4 knot to her top speed.

In 1953 she took part in the Fleet Review to celebrate the Coronation of Queen Elizabeth II. During early 1955 Totem carried out "Operation Defiant", a six-week patrol in the Barents Sea to gather Signals intelligence on Soviet naval forces.

Totem was refitted at Malta from December 1961 to January 1963, and then returned to home waters, recommissioning at Portsmouth with a new crew on 28 January 1963 before joining the 1st Submarine Flotilla at Gosport.

INS Dakar

She was commissioned into the Israeli Sea Corps on 10 November 1967 as INS Dakar (דקר, Grouper) under the command of Lieutenant Commander Ya'acov Ra'anan. British shipyards had modified the boat with a airlock to allow for underwater debarkation of naval commandos.

On 9 January 1968, Dakar departed from Portsmouth for Haifa. She was overloaded with sixty-nine aboard, well in excess of her normal crew of sixty. On the morning of 15 January, Dakar put into Gibraltar, departing at midnight, and proceeded across the Mediterranean Sea underwater using her snorkel mast. Her last position report was at 0610 on 24 January, when she gave a location just east of Crete. There were three further routine messages which did not provide a position, the last being at 0002 on 25 January.

Despite an extensive search, no trace was found of the vessel. Her stern emergency marker buoy washed ashore on the coast of Khan Yunis, an Arab town southwest of Gaza, just over a year later, on 9 February 1969.

The wreck was finally discovered on 24 May 1999 at a depth of 3,000 meters (9,800 ft). The precise cause of the accident is not known, but as no emergency measures appear to have been carried out. It appears that the submarine dived suddenly and rapidly past her maximum depth limit and suffered a catastrophic hull rupture. The emergency buoy was released by the violence of the hull collapse, and washed ashore after drifting for a year.

On 11 October 2000, Dakar's bridge and the forward edge of her sail were raised, and now stand as a memorial in the Clandestine Immigration and Naval Museum in Haifa.

Notes

References

External links
 Story of the INS Dakar

 

British T-class submarines of the Royal Navy
Ships built in Plymouth, Devon
1943 ships
World War II submarines of the United Kingdom
Cold War submarines of the United Kingdom
British T-class submarines of the Israeli Navy